The Aero A.100 was a biplane light bomber and reconnaissance aircraft built in Czechoslovakia during the 1930s. It was the final step in a design lineage that extended back to the Aero A.11 a decade earlier. A.100s remained in service throughout World War II and for a few years postwar.

Design and development
Development of the A.100 was in response to a Czechoslovak Air Force requirement of 1932 for a uniform replacement for the A.11s, Aero Ap.32s, and Letov Š.16s then in service. Work began with a revision of the Aero A.430 that quickly became quite a different aircraft. Of standard biplane configuration, the A.100 was a somewhat ungainly-looking aircraft which was obsolescent by the time of its first flight in 1933, becoming a member of the final generation of biplane military aircraft to be designed in Europe.

Operational history
Nevertheless, since the only other competitor for the air force contract, the Praga E.36, had not flown by the close of tenders, the A.100 was ordered for production. A total of 44 were built, in two batches.

Further development
The Aero A.100 was later developed into Aero A.101  with Praga Isotta Fraschini Asso 1000 RV engine (800 h.p.), first flying in December 1934, this type served in the Spanish Civil War curiously on both sides of the conflict. Further development led to Aero Ab.101 (enlarged hull and wings plus Avia Hispano Suiza HS 12 Ydrs engine rated 860 h.p.) produced from 1936 to 1937 and serving in the Czechoslovak Air Force up to its dissolution in March 1939. Final stage of the development was Aero A.104, where Ab.101 was converted to a high-wing monoplane with enclosed cockpit, only one prototype was built in 1937.

Specifications (A.100)

Operators

Czechoslovakian Air Force

Luftwaffe (small numbers) 

Slovak Air Force (1939-1945)

See also

References

Notes

Bibliography

 Ketley, Barry and Mark Rolfe. Luftwaffe Fledglings 1935-1945: Luftwaffe Training Units and their Aircraft. Aldershot, UK: Hikoki Publications, 1996.  .
 Sharpe, Michael. Biplanes, Triplanes, and Seaplanes. London: Friedman/Fairfax Books, 2000. . 
 Taylor, John W. R. and Jean Alexander. Combat Aircraft of the World. New York: G.P. Putnam's Sons, 1969. .
 Taylor, Michael J.H., ed. Jane's Encyclopedia of Aviation (2nd ed.). New York: Portland House, 1989. . 

1930s Czechoslovakian bomber aircraft
1930s Czechoslovakian military reconnaissance aircraft
Single-engined tractor aircraft
Biplanes
A100
Aircraft first flown in 1933